Talbot County Public Schools is a school district in Easton on Maryland's Eastern Shore. All of its schools are accredited by the Middle States Association of Colleges and Schools.

Board of education
The Board of Education has seven elected members, plus one student representative from each of its high schools.  As of October 22, 2021, the elected members are:
 Susan Delean-Botkin, president
 Michael Garman, vice president
 Otis Sampson
 Candance Henry
 Emily Jackson
 Mary Wheeler
 April Motovidlak

Member schools
The school district operates eight public schools.

Elementary schools
 Chapel District Elementary School, Cordova
 Easton Elementary School, Easton
 St. Michaels Elementary School, St. Michaels
 Tilghman Elementary School, Tilghman
 White Marsh Elementary School, Trappe

Secondary schools
 Easton High School Easton
 St. Michaels Middle/High School St. Michaels
 Easton Middle School, Easton

Laptop initiative
Talbot County became the first Maryland school system to implement a county-wide One-to-One laptop initiative in 2005, when it assigned a new laptop computer to each incoming 9th grader. Over the next four years, the system continued providing 9th graders with laptop computers until all of its high school students were using laptops.

References

School districts in Maryland
Education in Talbot County, Maryland